Erməni Bazar (also, Ermenibazar) is a village in the Agdash Rayon of Azerbaijan.

It is suspected that this village has undergone a name change or no longer exists, as no Azerbaijani website mentions it under this name.

References 

Populated places in Agdash District